FIFA assigns a three-letter country code (more properly termed a trigram or trigraph) to each of its member and non-member countries. These are the official codes used by FIFA and its continental confederations (AFC, CAF, CONCACAF, CONMEBOL, OFC and UEFA) as name abbreviations of countries and dependent areas, in official competitions.

FIFA member codes

There are currently 211 FIFA members, each one with its unique country code:

Non-FIFA member codes

The following codes refer to countries or dependent areas that are currently not affiliated with FIFA, but whose codes either appear in the FIFA results database, or are used regularly by confederation websites:

Irregular codes
The following codes refer to countries or dependent areas that are currently not affiliated with FIFA. Even though they are members or associate members of their regional confederations, these codes are not regularly used in.

Obsolete country codes
The following codes are obsolete because a country has ceased to exist (e.g. by merging into another or splitting into several countries), changed its name or its code:

FIFA, IOC and ISO differences

For the majority of countries, FIFA codes are the same as both the International Olympic Committee country codes used for the Olympic Games and the ISO 3166 country codes. When these two are different, FIFA mostly chooses the IOC code, sometimes the ISO code. For three countries, FIFA uses a distinct code. Codes that differ from the FIFA code are coloured in light red.

There are also some countries that are affiliated to FIFA and not to the International Olympic Committee, and vice versa:

 FIFA affiliates and non IOC members (13):
 Anguilla
 Curaçao
 England
 Faroe Islands
 Gibraltar
 Macau
 Montserrat
 New Caledonia
 Northern Ireland
 Scotland
 Tahiti
 Turks and Caicos Islands
 Wales
 IOC members and non FIFA affiliates (8):
 Great Britain
 Kiribati
 Marshall Islands
 Micronesia
 Monaco
 Nauru
 Palau
 Tuvalu

See also
 Comparison of alphabetic country codes
 List of FIFA Member Associations
 List of IOC country codes
 List of ISO country codes

References

External links
 FIFA Country Codes – list maintained by the Rec.Sport.Soccer Statistics Foundation Usenet group.

Country codes
FIFA country codes
Country codes